Mesohedenstroemia is a genus of ammonites. It was described by Chao in 1959, who described three species; M. kwangsiana (the type species), M. inflata Chao, 1959, and M. planata, from the Triassic of what is now China. A new species, M. olgae, was described from the Olenekian of Russia by Yuri D. Zakharov and Nasrin Mousavi Abnavi in 2012, and was named in honour of Olga P. Smyshyaeva.

Distribution
China and Russia

References

Hedenstroemiidae
Triassic ammonites
Ceratitida genera